William John Houghton (born 19 December 1955) is a Zimbabwean former cricketer, the older brother of David Houghton.

References

1955 births
Living people
Rhodesia cricketers
Zimbabwean cricketers